Gmünd is a town in the northwestern Waldviertel region of Lower Austria and the capital of the Gmünd district. The municipality consists of the Katastralgemeinden Böhmzeil, Breitensee, Eibenstein, Gmünd and Grillenstein. Situated on the Lainsitz (Lužnice) river where it forms the border with České Velenice in the Czech Republic, it is an important road and railway crossing point, next to the  Blockheide protected area.

The development of the town, first mentioned in a 1208 deed, was decisively pushed by the inauguration of the Emperor Franz Joseph Railway from Vienna to Prague in 1869. By the 1919 Treaty of Saint-Germain its northern part Dolní Velenice, German: Unterwielands, with the main station was awarded to Czechoslovakia, forming the new town of České Velenice.

Politics
Seats in the municipal assembly (Gemeinderat) as of 2005 elections:
Social Democratic Party of Austria (SPÖ): 16
Austrian People's Party (ÖVP): 11
Freedom Party of Austria (FPÖ): 1
Green party: 1

Seats in the municipal assembly (Gemeinderat) as of 2010 elections:
Social Democratic Party of Austria (SPÖ): 15
Austrian People's Party (ÖVP): 12
Freedom Party of Austria (FPÖ): 2

Notable natives
 Alfred Worm, Austrian investigative journalist
 Walter Nowotny, Austrian fighter ace of World War II

Twin town
 Sarreguemines, Moselle, Grand Est, France

References

External links

Austria–Czech Republic border crossings
Cities and towns in Gmünd District
Divided cities